Zina Aita (1900–1967) was a Brazilian artist that practised early modernism within Brazilian culture. She worked hard with many artists in this time trying to captivate and enhance Brazil's unique culture to the public, something that was uniquely brazils. She participated in The Week of Modern Art 

in Brazil with multiple friends and other Brazilian artists. She practiced early modernism in Brazil until she moved to Italy where she switched to watercolors and ceramics till she then died from natural causes.

Biography 
Zina Aita spent most of her childhood in Naples, a city in Italy. She was born in an art-driven family surrounding her family's business in Italy of a ceramics business. She moved to Brazil as she became an adult where early modernism in Brazil was at its peak. She became very engaged in the movement and through the early modernist movement she moved heavily with multiple art techniques and styles. She worked with watercolors, tapestries, oil on canvas, drawing, and ceramics. She worked with modernism and participated in celebrations over Brazil's unique culture. Towards the end of her life, she moved back to Italy where she took over her family's business in ceramics.

Career 
Aita was heavily involved in the modernist movement in Brazil throughout her career.
Early Modernism in Brazil consisted of a movement to bring a new and independent version of Brazil that was authentic and bold. Artists worked with modernism as a way to break and reject the academic art style. Multiple artists participated in this movement, including Aita.

Aita worked in São Paulo during her early career. Then, in 1922, she participated in an art event called Semana de Arte Moderna (Week of Modern Art). The event was meant to highlight the modernist work that artists were doing in Brazil at the time. Many well-known artists like Tarsila Amaral, John Graz, and many more participated in this event.

Aita primarily worked with landscapes and self-portraits. Through these connections and her unique artwork, she was invited to participate in many art events.

Exhibitions 
 1922 – Modern Art Week (São Paulo, SP)
 1952 – Angelicum Exhibition (São Paulo, SP)
 1954 – Contemporary Art: exhibition of the collection of the Museum of Modern Art of São Paulo (São Paulo, SP)
 1972 – The Week of 22: antecedents and consequences (São Paulo, SP)
 1979 – Portraits by Mario de Andrade (São Paulo), SP)
 1982 – From Modernism to the Bienal (São Paulo, SP)
 2010 – sp-arte (São Paulo, SP)

Artworks 
 Zina Aita. Men Working (1922)
 Zina Aita. Gardener (1922)
 Zina Aita. A Sombra. (c. 1922)
 Zina Aita. Estdo de cebeca. (c. 1922)
 Zina Aita. Paisagem. (c.1922)
 Zina Aita. Mascaras Siamesas (c. 1922)
 Zina Aita. Aquarium. (c. 1922)
 Zina Aita. Figura. (c. 1922)
 Zina Aita. Painel decorativo. (c. 1922)
 Zina Aita. 25 impressoes. (c. 1922)
 Zina Aita. Dois desenhos. (c. 1922)

Semana de Arte 
Aita participated along with several modern-day artists in Semana de Arte. Aita worked within this exhibition with art workers such as Men Working and Gardener.

Semana de Arte was a week exhibition in São Paulo, Brazil, where they celebrated modern art within Brazilian culture. This historical event highlighted multiple art forms such as dance, music, theatre, writers, and artist to share their creative sides to step away from the traditional way of doing things. This event gave artists a voice to share their impressions of Brazil and recognize what made Brazil the way it is. This highlights the way Brazil came to be within finding their own style stepping away from the academic art style. Semana de Arte was there to celebrate artwork that was uniquely Brazil.

References 

1900 births
1967 deaths
Italian watercolourists
20th-century Brazilian painters
Artists from Naples
People of Campanian descent
Brazilian women painters
20th-century Brazilian women artists
Italian emigrants to Brazil
Italian ceramists